Arhopala birmana, the Burmese bushblue, is a species of lycaenid or blue butterfly found in the Indomalayan realm.

Subspecies
A. b. birmana Assam, Burma, Thailand, Laos, Vietnam, Hong Kong
A. b. asakurae (Matsumura, 1910) Taiwan
A. b. hiurai (Hayashi, 1976) Palawan (Philippines)

References

Arhopala
Butterflies of Asia
Butterflies of Indochina
Taxa named by Frederic Moore
Butterflies described in 1883